Emoia slevini, also known commonly as the Mariana skink, Slevin's brown skink, Slevin's emo skink, and Slevin's skink, is a species of lizard in the family Scincidae. The species is endemic to the Mariana Islands.

Etymology
The specific name, slevini, is in honor of American herpetologist Joseph Richard Slevin.

Habitat

Description
E. slevini is a moderately large-sized species for its genus.

Reproduction
E. slevini is oviparous.

References

Further reading
Brown WC (1991). "Lizards of the Genus Emoia (Scincidae) with Observations on Their Evolution and Biogeography". Memoirs of the California Academy of Sciences (13): 1–94. (Emoia slevini, pp. 15–16, Figure 8). 
Brown WC, Falanruw MVC (1972). "A new lizard of the genus Emoia (Scincidae) from the Marianas Islands". Proceedings of the California Academy of Sciences 39 (9): 105–110. (Emoia slevini, new species).
Goldberg SR (2017). "Emoia slevini (Slevin's Brown Skink) Reproduction". Herpetological Review 48 (3): 643–644.
Greer AE (1974). "The generic relationships of the scincid lizard genus Leiolopisma and its relatives". Australian Journal of Zoology Supplemental Series 22 (31): 1–67. (Emoia slevini, p. 20).
McCoid MJ, Rodda GH, Fritts TH (1995). "Distribution and Abundance of Emoia slevini (Scincidae) in the Mariana Islands". Herpetological Review 29 (2): 70, 72.

Emoia
Reptiles described in 1972
Taxa named by Walter Creighton Brown
Taxa named by Marjorie V.C. Falanruw